Semblance is a puzzle-platform game developed by Nyamakop, a South African game development studio, and published by Good Shepherd Entertainment. It was released on July 24, 2018 for Microsoft Windows, OS X and Nintendo Switch.

Gameplay 
Semblance is a 2D platform game where the player can deform parts of the platforms, which are made out of Play-Doh. Through a disaster, the blob-like creature the player controls the world of hardness that has infected the normally soft world. The deforming terrain enables the player to avoid dangerous obstacles and reach higher places.

Release 
The game was released on July 24, 2018.

References

External links 
 

Cooperative video games

Multiplayer and single-player video games
Windows games
MacOS games
Indie video games
Nintendo Switch games
Puzzle-platform games
Single-player video games
Video games developed in South Africa